Joseph Alexander may refer to:

 Joseph Alexander (cellist) (1772–1840), German cellist and music teacher
 Joseph Addison Alexander (1809–1860), American bible scholar
 Joseph W. Alexander (born 1947), American politician
 J. Grubb Alexander (1887–1932), full name Joseph Grubb Alexander, American screenwriter
 Joseph H. Alexander (c. 1938–2014), retired American marine
 Joe Alexander (born 1986), American basketball player
 Doc Alexander (Joseph Alexander; 1898–1975), American football player and coach